Sharp Takaya Electronics Industry Co. Ltd. is a computer equipment manufacturer mostly owned by Sharp Corporation.

Description
Some products have been sold directly to original equipment manufacturers under the Takaya brand. One of the many testers still in daily use is the APT-8300 fixtureless tester, a three-axis flying probe tester.

Japanese companies established in 1918
Electronics companies of Japan
Takaya
Companies based in Okayama Prefecture